Gedenkdienst is the concept of facing and taking responsibility for the darkest chapters of one's own country's history while ideally being financially supported by one's own country's government to do so. Founded in Austria in 1992 by Andreas Maislinger the Gedenkdienst is an alternative to Austria's compulsory national military service as well as a volunteering platform for Austrians to work in Holocaust- and Jewish culture-related institutions around the world with governmental financial support. In Austria it is also referred to as Austrian Holocaust Memorial Service provided by the Austrian Service Abroad. The Austrian Gedenkdienst serves the remembrance of the crimes of Nazism, commemorates its victims and supports Jewish cultural future. The program is rooted in the acknowledgment of responsibility by the Austrian government for the crimes committed by National Socialism.

Concept 

Gedenkdienst is the concept of facing and taking responsibility for the darkest chapters of one's own country's history while (ideally) being financially supported by one's own government to do so. Gedenkdienst has the acknowledgment of, the apology for and the assumption of responsibility for atrocities done by one's own country's society in history as its basis. Gedenkdienst is not the attribution of past guilt to other people but other people voluntarily taking responsibility for evil done by perpetrators of their own country. Gedenkdienst is about honesty with one's own country's past and the desire to rectify past wrongs. Gedenkdienst is about laying a foundation for an improvement of the relationship between the conflicted parties. Gedenkdienst is about providing people of the perpetrator's side a platform for education and going to the victim's side to serve the remembrance of the evil done and the commemoration of its victims. Gedenkdienst is about members of the perpetrator's side supporting life and culture on the victim's side. Gedenkdienst is about peace on the basis of honesty and responsibility regarding the past. Gedenkdeinst is about embodying and enacting apology.

In the case of Austria, Gedenkdienst remembers the Holocaust and supports Jewish culture and life as well as those of other victim groups of the Holocaust. In other countries a Gedenkdienst may remember different atrocities and victims.

History

Origin 

The historian, political scientist and scientific director of the Braunau Contemporary History Days Dr. Andreas Maislinger promoted the idea of an alternative service to the compulsory military service dedicated to the research, understanding and remembrance of the Holocaust as well as the commemoration of its victims since the late 1970s. On October 10, 1980, he was invited by political scientist Prof. Anton Pelinka to present his "civilian service in Auschwitz" in Dolores Bauer's television-broadcast "Kreuzverhör". In a response the Austrian Federal President Rudolf Kirchschläger rejected his idea with the statement "An Austrian has nothing to atone in Auschwitz". Later Kirchschläger backtracked on his statement acknowledging the "positive achievement" of the "accomplished holocaust memorial service" of Andreas Maislinger.

1980/81 Maislinger volunteered together with Joachim Schlör in the Poland department of the German Action Reconciliation Service for Peace. In the Museum Auschwitz-Birkenau he guided German teenager groups. After his return he was more convinced than ever to realize a similar programme in Austria. In this endeavor he was supported by Simon Wiesenthal, Teddy Kollek, Ari Rath, Herbert Rosenkranz, Gerhard Röthler and Karl Pfeifer. 

In 1991 Austrian chancellor Franz Vranitzky was the first chancellor of Austria to admit and acknowledge the Austrian people's share of responsibility for the crimes committed by National Socialism during WWII. The new approach rejected the then established myth of Austria merely being the first victim of Nazism. This signaled a new approach within the Austrian political establishment regarding its stance and treatment of Austria's and Austrians' roles during the time of National Socialism. The Gedenkdienst is an outflow of this recognition.

Realisation 
In 1991 Andreas Maislinger received a letter from the Minister of Interior Franz Löschnak informing him that the Gedenkdienst was permitted by the Austrian government to be an alternative to the civilian service. The needed funds would be provided by the Federal Ministry of Interior.

Acknowledgments

Supporting associations

Association Never Forget from 1994 to 2017 
The association provided positions in 19 memorial sites in Germany and Poland. The association "Never Forget" took an active part in youth work against forgetting. The association stopped operations and became defunct in 2017.

Austrian Service Abroad since 1998 (Österreichischer Auslandsdienst) 

Andreas Hörtnagl and Andreas Maislinger founded the organization "Austrian Service Abroad" in 1998.

The organization is the largest in Austria and sends Auslandsdiener to six continents of the world to accomplish Holocaust commemoration work, social services and peace services. The Austrian Service Abroad is characterized by offering three types of service: the Gedenkdienst, the Austrian Social Service and the Austrian Peace Service.

The Gedenkdienst since 1992 

Walter Gruggenberger (SPÖ), Andreas Hörtnagl (ÖVP) and Andreas Maislinger (politically independent) founded the association of the Gedenkdienst in 1992. The association wanted to enhance Holocaust awareness, including its causes and consequences. The association is responsible for the assortment and care of its volunteers before, during and after their service. The volunteers have the possibility to apply for one of the partner organizations. In addition to that understanding the role of the Austrians as offenders, victims and bystanders is very important. Also women have the possibility to provide a one-year-long Gedenkdienst as part of the European Voluntary Service (EVS). Female volunteers were sponsored for the first time in the year 2008 by the "Geschwister-Mezei-Fond", which was created with the goal to give women the possibility to accomplish the Gedenkdienst under the same conditions as civilian servants.

Partner organizations 

Buenos Aires – Centro de Atencion Integral a la Niñez y Adolescencia (first intern sent in 1998)

Melbourne - Jewish Holocaust Museum and Research Centre (2007)
Melbourne - Jewish Museum of Australia (2007)

Braunau am Inn - House of Responsibility

Brussels – La Mémoire d'Auschwitz (1999)

Petrópolis - Casa Stefan Zweig (2007)
The Casa Stefan Zweig was founded in 2006 with the objective to establish a museum dedicated to the Austrian-Jewish author Stefan Zweig and his wife in their last residence in Petrópolis. Stefan Zweig was one of the world's most popular writers in the 1920s and 1930s. With the Second World War pending and the persecution of Jews rising, he emigrated first to London and later to Brazil where he and his wife committed suicide in 1941. The Gedenkdiener takes a key role in the organization as he welcomes and guides visitors through the museum - by now a renowned cultural institution, popular among visitors from all around the world. Furthermore, the volunteer is involved in the organization of cultural events and the cooperation with local schools, universities and similar institutions.

Sofia - Organization of the Jews in Bulgaria "Shalom" (2004)

Montreal - Holocaust Memorial Centre (1998)
The Montreal Holocaust Memorial Centre was founded by a group of Holocaust survivors and opened to the public in 1979. Through its Museum, its commemorative programs and its educational initiatives, the centre aims to alert the public to the dangers of anti-Semitism, bigotry and hate, while promoting respect for diversity and the sanctity of human life. The field of activity of an ‘Austrian Holocaust Memorial Volunteer’ at the Montreal Holocaust Memorial Centre is very diverse. The duties range from helping with tasks in the office, to translations (German-English) as well as to research assistance or to the description and digitization of collection artefacts. Another essential part of the work schedule is covering the museum front desk. In doing so, the volunteer interacts with Holocaust survivors, students, teachers and visitors to coordinate tours and to ensure a proper daily routine. Furthermore, the volunteer is involved in several projects and events including "Witness to History", "A Bar &Bat Mitzvah to Remember", "Kristallnacht Commemoration", and others.
Montreal - Kleinmann Family Foundation Montreal (2002)
The Gedenkdiener at the "Kleinmann Family Foundation" digitalizes and archives artifacts, documents and photographs as well as maintains and improves the database and the website. The volunteer gives presentations in high schools and colleges about the Holocaust and Moral Responsibility. The servant also interviews Holocaust survivors for "Oral History"-projects.
Toronto  - Sarah and Chaim Neuberger Holocaust Education Centre / Hillel Canada (2010)
This internship is a joint partnership between Jewish Federation of Canada-United Israel Appeal of Canada's University campus Hillel Canada and United Jewish Appeal Federation of Greater Toronto's Sarah and Chaim Neuberger Holocaust Education Centre. The intern's primary responsibilities will be to complete projects that have been assigned by the two agencies. The intern will be supporting students in developing new education programs in terms of the Holocaust with the center and on university campuses. Other tasks are: support for the organization of the education trip to Vienna for Canadian, Jewish students, outreach to, and maintaining connection with local schools in terms of Holocaust education related activities.

Harbin - Harbin Jewish Research Center (planned)
Shanghai - Center of Jewish Studies (2005)
Nanjing - John Rabe and International Safety Zone Memorial Hall (2008)

Jasenovac - Jasenovac concentration camp (planned)

Prague - Jewish Community of Prague (1998)

Oradour - Centre de la Mémoire d'Oradour (2002)
Paris - Amicale de Mauthausen (2008)
The Amicale de Mauthausen is a French organisation in memory of the history of the Mauthausen concentration camp and its many subcamps. Founded in October 1945 by survivors of these camps, the Amicale de Mauthausen is present at the annual liberation ceremonies at the sites in Austria and organizes excursions for French high school students and its members. The volunteers tasks at the Amicale include French-German translations and helping with the organization of excursions, as well as the digitalization of the Amicale's archives. 
Paris - La Fondation pour la Mémoire de la Déportation (1999)
Strasbourg - Congress of Local and Regional Authorities of the Council of Europe (2011)
The tasks of the Gedenkdiener include helping to organize activities of the new installed "European Alliance of Cities and Regions for Roma Inclusion".  Due to the middle- to long term aim of the alliance, the Gedenkdiener will support the alliance in creating a list of cities and regions which are interested in future cooperation. Moreover the servant will take part in field studies as well as meetings with Roma organizations. Furthermore the Gedenkdiener helps the congress in its work in the field of human rights and democracy on a local and regional basis as well as in the coordination of the congress and of the Special Representative of the Secretary General for Roma Issues.

Berlin - Jewish Museum Berlin (1999)
Moringen - Concentration Camp Memorial at Torhaus Moringen (1999)
Munich - Jewish Museum Munich (2008)

London - Institute of Contemporary History and Wiener Library (1998)
London - The National Yad Vashem Charitable Trust (1999)
London - Holocaust Survivors’ Centre (2015)
The Austrian Service Abroad cooperates with the Holocaust Survivors' Centre to send out the Gedenkdiener from Austria to London. The foreigner takes on a number of different tasks such as booking speakers for lectures, organizing trips or helping them with the new technology. The main task is to offer the survivors a long time of attention.

Budapest - European Roma Rights Centre (2002)

Jerusalem - St. Vinzenz-Ein Karem (2001)
Jerusalem - Yad Vashem (2001)
Kibbutz Lohamei HaGeta'ot - Ghetto Fighters' House (2008)

Milan - Centro di Documentazione Ebraica Contemporanea (1999)
The main task of the Gedenkdiener is to translate and correct German articles. He is also responsible for cataloging materials and organizing events at the centre. To take care of visitors is another task for the Gedenkdiener.
Prato - Museo della Deportazione (2008)
The main part of the interns work is giving guided tours through the museum (normally for groups of students between the age of 14 and 19) and giving them an overview of the system of concentration camps and the Shoah. It is also the responsibility of the intern to work in the library of the documentation centre and to catalog new books added to the library. On a regular basis there are speeches and discussions in the documentation centre where the help of the intern is required. The intern has to help organise (and participate in) any trip of the museum. For instance every two years to the Auschwitz-Birkenau State Museum in Poland and every year to the former concentration camp of Mauthausen-Gusen in Austria (always with Italian students).
Rome - Fondazione Museo della Shoah (2012)

Riga - Museum of the Occupation of Latvia (2014)
The main task of the volunteer is to give guided tours through the museum showing the 51-year period in the 20th century when Latvia was successively occupied by Nazi Germany and the USSR. Furthermore, the volunteer works in close cooperation with the Museum "Jews in Latvia". It was established to research, popularize and commemorate the history of Latvia's Jewish community. The museum's founder Margers Vestermanis was awarded the Austrian Holocaust Memorial Award in 2015 in honor for his work reviving Jewish culture in Latvia. The other volunteer's tasks are versatile like the translation of documents, the digitization of artifacts or the planning of temporary exhibits.

Vilnius – Vilna Gaon Museum of Jewish History

Skopje (planned)

Amsterdam - United (2002) (2010)

Oslo - Jewish Community (2000)
Oslo - Norwegian Center for Studies of Holocaust and Religious Minorities (2014)

Oświęcim - Auschwitz Jewish Center (2004)
The Volunteers main duty at the AJCF in Oświęcim is to give guided tours through the museum, the Synagogue, the town and the Jewish cemetery. Tours are held in German and English. Furthermore, the Volunteer helps in the museum's Café. Additionally, holocaust remembrance servants help with translations from German to English and vice versa.
Oświęcim - International Youth Meeting Center in Oświęcim/Auschwitz (1997)
Kraków - Judaica Foundation - Center For Jewish Culture (1999)
Kraków - Galicia Jewish Museum (2010)
Kraków - Polish Humanitarian Organisation (2004)
Warsaw - POLIN Museum of the History of Polish Jews (2008)

Moscow - Russian Research and Educational Holocaust Center (2000)

Ljubljana - National Museum of Contemporary History (2010)

Uppsala - Uppsala Programme for Holocaust and Genocide Studies (2008)
Stockholm - Forum för levande historia (2009)

Istanbul - Jewish Museum Istanbul (2012)

Chicago - Illinois Holocaust Museum and Education Center (2010)
The main work scope of the intern is focused on the organisation of field trips. Field Trips are the main part of the education program of the museum. The intern helps to bring the students in the museum and guiding them to their docents. Moreover he is responsible for the Audio Guide system which assures a non-disruptive communication between the school group and the docent. Further tasks are work with survivors, translation of documents and assisting at events.
Detroit - Holocaust Memorial Center (1999)
Houston - Holocaust Museum Houston (1999)
Los Angeles - Simon Wiesenthal Center (1998)
Los Angeles - Los Angeles Museum of the Holocaust (2007)
The Austrian Holocaust Memorial Servant at the Los Angeles Museum of the Holocaust serves as tour guide, facilitates seminars and lectures by survivor docents an work with teachers to schedule and coordinate tours. The volunteer interacts with Holocaust survivors, students, teachers and visitors to the museum on a daily basis. The servant also works with primary documents and artifacts, which he translates, reviews and interprets.
Los Angeles - USC Shoah Foundation Institute for Visual History and Education (1999)
New Orleans - National World War II Museum (planned)
New York - Museum of Jewish Heritage (2000)
New York - Anti Defamation League (2008)
New York - American Jewish Committee (2009)
For more than a century, AJC has been the leading global Jewish advocacy organization. With offices across the United States and around the globe, and partnerships with Jewish communities worldwide, AJC works to enhance the well-being of the Jewish people and to advance human rights and democratic values for all. The Gedenkdiener is part of ACCESS, AJC’s young leadership division. Besides organizing ACCESS National trips to countries around the world, the servant also coordinates the work of different chapters of ACCESS throughout the United States, and supervises their programming. Furthermore, the servant often assists in numerous other ACCESS-related projects (e.g. diplomatic outreach).  
Reno - Center for Holocaust, Genocide & Peace Studies (1999)
Richmond - Virginia Holocaust Museum (1999)
The Virginia Holocaust Museum features 28 exhibitions including "The Ipson Saga", which documents the story of museum director and founder Jay M. Ipson and his family from pre-war Lithuania, through their escape to liberation. The Nuremberg Trials Courtroom exhibition is the only existing replica of the famous courtroom that set the standard for modern international law. The tasks for the Gedenkdiener are manifold. Duties at the Virginia Holocaust Museum range from giving tours through the permanent exhibit to translations (German-English) to assisting in research or helping at the reception desk among other things.
San Francisco - Holocaust Center of Northern California (1999)
St. Petersburg - The Florida Holocaust Museum (1999)
The FHM was founded by Walter Loebenberg and his wife Edith in 1992. Today the museum is located in the heart of the city Saint Petersburg. The respective tasks vary from intern to intern depending on the interests of the Gedenkdiener. The primary work is for the Education department. The intern is trained to be a docent to the give tours and helps creating the so-called "teaching trunks" that the museum ships out for free to all schools in the contiguous United States. Other projects include the translation of old German documents and the filming of Holocaust survivors that talk at the museum with school groups regularly.

Wellington - Holocaust Centre of New Zealand

Austrian Holocaust Memorial Award 
Andreas Maislinger also initiated the Austrian Holocaust Memorial Award (AHMA), rewarding people who actively contribute to the remembrance of the Holocaust. On 17 October 2006 the Chinese historian Pan Guang was awarded the first AHMA prize. Further recipients were the Brazilian journalist Alberto Dines, French Robert Hébras, who was one of only six people, who survived the Massacre of Oradour and Lithuanian-American Holocaust survivor and co-founder of the Virginia Holocaust Museum Jay M. Ipson. In October 2010 Eva Marks was honored with the AHMA by Austrian Ambassador Hannes Porias in Melbourne.

Honoring 

In 2005 the founder of the Gedenkdienst Andreas Maislinger received the Decoration for Services to the Republic of Austria in Silver from the president of Austria, Heinz Fischer, and the Medal of Merit of the state of Tirol from Herwig van Staa and Luis Durnwalder.

On 8 November 2009 Maislinger was awarded with a Lifetime Achievement Award for "his 10 year fight to obtain official recognition of alternative, philanthropic service" at the Annual Dinner of the Los Angeles Museum of the Holocaust together with Holocaust survivor and producer of Schindler's List Branko Lustig.

See also 
Andreas Maislinger
Stefan Stoev
Austrian Peace Service
Austrian Service Abroad
Austrian Social Service
House of Responsibility
Paper Clips Project

References

External links 
 Austrian Service Abroad
 

Anti-fascism
Holocaust commemoration
Holocaust-related organizations
Simon Wiesenthal Center
Aftermath of World War II in Austria
Foreign relations of Austria
Innsbruck
Braunau am Inn
International nongovernmental organizations
Non-profit organisations based in Austria
Jews and Judaism in Austria
Student exchange
Organizations established in 1992
The Holocaust in Austria
1992 establishments in Austria